Prempeh I (Otumfuo Nana Prempeh I; 18 December 1870 – 12 May 1931) was the thirteenth king ruler of the Ashanti Empire and the Oyoko Abohyen Dynasty. King Prempeh I ruled from March 26, 1888 until his death in 1931, and fought an Ashanti war against Britain in 1893.

Biography

Early life and family
King Asantehene Prempeh I's original throne name was Prince Kwaku Dua III Asamu of the Ashanti Empire. Prempeh I's mother, Queen Asantehemaa Yaa Akyaa, was queen mother of Ashanti from 1880 to 1917. Through strategic political marriages she built the military power to secure the Golden Stool for her son Prince Prempeh.

Reign 

In 1888 Prince Prempeh ascended the throne, using the name Kwaku Dua III.  His kingship was beset by difficulties from the very onset of his reign. He began the defending of Ashanti from Britain and when Prempeh I was asked by Britain to accept a protectorate over Ashanti, he rejected it and stated in his reply that Britain had miscalculated.  He began an active campaign of the Ashanti sovereignty. The British offered to take Ashanti under their protection, but he refused each request.

Ashanti-British relations 

In December 1895, the British left Cape Coast with an expeditionary force. It arrived in Kumasi in January 1896 under the command of Robert Baden-Powell. The Asantehene directed the Ashanti to not resist the British advance, as he feared reprisals from Britain if the expedition turned violent. Shortly thereafter, Governor William Maxwell arrived in Kumasi as well.

Britain annexed the territories of the Ashanti and the Fanti, even though the British and Fante were allies during this time, they still did it. Asantehene Agyeman Prempeh was deposed and arrested, and he and other Ashanti leaders were sent into exile in the Seychelles. The Ashanti Empire was dissolved. The British formally declared the state of the Ashanti and the coastal regions to be the Gold Coast colony. A British Resident was permanently placed in the city of Kumasi, and soon after a British fort was built there.

Eleven years later, Baden-Powell published "Scouting for Boys". Eventually Prempeh was released, and subsequently he became Chief Scout of the Gold Coast.

The Telegraph Battalion of the Royal Engineers (predecessor of the Royal Corps of Signals) played a prominent part in the Ashanti Campaign; men of the Telegraph Battalion hacked a path for an overhead line from the Coast to Prahsu, covering 72 miles through the jungle. These troops then staggered out of the jungle, confronted King Prempeh and accepted the surrender of his army. King Prempeh's throne is now displayed in the Royal Signals Museum at Blandford.

In 1900, a request that the Ashanti people turn over the "golden stool" – the very symbol of Ashanti absolute monarchy governance to the Ashanti people. The Kingdom of Ashanti gave no resistance and became semi-autonomous members of the British Empire. The Ashanti did later rebel against the British to fight the War of the Golden Stool (also known as the Yaa Asantewaa War) in 1900-01. In the end, the British were victorious; they exiled Asantewaa and other Asante leaders to the Seychelles to join Asante King Prempeh I.  In January 1902, Britain finally designated Asanteman as a protectorate.  Asanteman was restored to independence on 31 January 1935.

Prempeh I spent time in his villa on Mahe from repatriation, the largest of the Seychelles in the Indian Ocean, the villa was formerly a huge plantation, covered with coconut trees, mango, breadfruit and orange trees as well as a two-story villa. Prempeh I villa, and 16 new wooden houses with sandy floors and roofed with corrugated iron-sheets were built in Seychelles and allocated for the various Asante nobles.  Prempeh made an effort to educate himself in English and to make certain that the children received education.

The King Asantehene Prempeh I once stated, "My Kingdom of Ashanti will never commit itself to any such policy of protection; Ashanti people and the Kingdom of Ashanti must remain an independent sovereign state as of old, and at the same time be friends with all white men".

Death 
Upon Prempeh's death on 12 May 1931, he was succeeded by his heir apparent Prempeh II as Asantehene. He was buried in Kumasi.

See also
Ashanti people  
Rulers of the Kingdom of Ashanti
Molly Germaine Prempeh

References

Further reading
Walter Hansen (in German):Der Wolf, der nie schläft-Das abenteuerliche Leben des Lord Baden-Powell, published by Herder Freiburg-Basel-Vienna, 1985, p. 162 (Gruß, Pfiff und System der kleinen Gruppe) and p. 124, p. 126/27 (Die Krobos:Geheimbund an der Goldküste).
Topics in West African History, by A. Adu Boahen, Jacob F. Ade Ajayi, and Michael Tidy. Addison-Wesley, 1987.
African Glory, by J. C. Degraft-Johnson. Black Classic Press, 1986
The Downfall of Prempeh: A diary of life with the native levy in Ashanti 1895-96, by Lord Baden-Powell of Gilwell.  The American edition is available for download at http://www.thedump.scoutscan.com/dumpinventorybp.php
Smithsonian Magazine

External links
King Prempeh's throne
Asantehene (ruler of Asante). 
Manhyia archives
Kingdom of Ashanti Kings And Queens Of Asante

External links
 

1870 births
1931 deaths
Ashanti monarchs
People from Kumasi